L'Essor was a Belgian artist group, which exhibited from 1876 to 1891.

History
L'Essor was created in 1876, within the "Circle of alumni and students of the Academies of Fine Arts in Brussels". 
The circle changes its name to L'Essor in November 1879, and no longer has any link with the Academy. 
The motto was "a unique art, one life", and therefore focuses on the relationship that should unite the Art to Life. 
The founders are seen as progressive and want to rebel against bourgeois and conservative Literary and Artistic Circles of Brussels.

Members of L'Essor 
Louis Cambier, Léon Herbo, Henri Permeke (father of Constant Permeke), Louis Pion and Franz Seghers, are among the founders of L'Essor.
When changing the name to l'Essor, Emile Hoeterickx, Julien Dillens, Amédée Lynen and Auguste-Ernest Sembach joined the group.

Gradually, other artists joined l'Essor: Fernand Khnopff (participating for the first time at an exhibition of l'Essor in 1881), Frantz Charlet, James Ensor, Darío de Regoyos, Albert Baertsoen, John Mayne, Théo van Rysselberghe, Willy Schlobach, Guillaume Vogels, Léon Frédéric, François-Joseph Halkett, Peter George, Adolphe Hamesse, Alexandre Hannotiau, Léon Houyoux, Antoine Lacroix.

Split and creation of the group Les XX and For Art
In 1883, a few artists left the movement after a disagreement in order to create a new artistic group Les XX. This dissatisfaction has come primarily from the fact that l'Essor had no real program and welcomed both realistic and traditional artists than avant-garde.
The artistic circle l'Essor was officially dissolved in 1891.

The association of artists Pour l'Art, also emerged in 1892.

References

Belgian artist groups and collectives
Belgian artists
1876 establishments in Belgium
1891 disestablishments